Hyloscirtus conscientia, the Chical nubulous stream frog, is a species of frog in the family Hylidae. It is endemic to Ecuador and likely in adjacent Colombia. Scientists have seen it between 1495 and 1750 meters above sea level.

The adult male frog measures about 29.6–33.3 mm in snout-vent length and the adult female frog 34.7 to 40 mm.  The skin of the dorsum tends to be yellow-green in color with a brown stripe, and they tend to be lighter in color on the flanks.

Ecuadorian teenagers associated with the research team named this frog. The scientific name refers to the Latin idea conscientia for consciousness. She said human beings had to be conscious of their effect on the environment and stop these frogs from dying by using less water.  Another teenager chose the common name "nubular" even though it is not a word in either Spanish or English.  It sounds like the Spanish word for "cloudy," and the frog lives in cloudy habitats.

References

Frogs of South America
Endemic fauna of Ecuador
Amphibians described in 2021